is a city located in southern Shiga Prefecture, Japan. , the city had an estimated population of 54,607 in 24305 households and a population density of 780 persons per km².

Geography
Konan, as its name implies, is south of Lake Biwa in the center of the southern portion of Shiga Prefecture The city does not actually border the lake. The Ansei Mountains are in the south of the city and the Iwane Mountains in the north, with the Yasu River running from east-to-west through the center.

Neighboring municipalities
Shiga Prefecture
Yasu
Rittō
Kōka
Ryūō

Climate
Konan has a Humid subtropical climate (Köppen Cfa) characterized by warm summers and cool winters with light to no snowfall.  The average annual temperature in Konan is 14.1 °C. The average annual rainfall is 1430 mm with September as the wettest month. The temperatures are highest on average in August, at around 26.0 °C, and lowest in January, at around 2.6 °C.

Demographics
Per Japanese census data, the population of Konan increased rapidly in the 1970s but has plateaued in recent decades.

History 
Konan is part of ancient  Ōmi Province and contains Ishibe-juku, the 51st post station on the route of the  Tōkaidō highway connecting Heian-kyō with the eastern provinces during the Edo period. The village of Ishibe was established within Kōka District, Shiga with the creation of the modern municipalities system on April 1, 1889. It was elevated to town status on June 1, 1903. On October 1, 2004, Ishibe merged with the neighboring town of  Kōsei (also from Kōka District) to form the city of Konan. I

Government
Konan has a mayor-council form of government with a directly elected mayor and a unicameral city council of 18 members. Konan contributes two members to the Shiga Prefectural Assembly. In terms of national politics, the city is part of Shiga 4th district of the lower house of the Diet of Japan.

Economy
The economy of Konan is centered on agriculture and light manufacturing. The Konan Industrial Park on the Meishin Expressway is the largest industrial park in the prefecture.

Education
Konan has nine public elementary schools and four public middle schools operated by the city government. There are two public high schools operated by the Shiga Prefectural Department of Education. The prefecture also operates one special education school for the handicapped.

Transportation

Railway
 JR West – Kusatsu Line
  -  -

Highway
  Meishin Expressway

Friendship city relations 
  St. Johns, Michigan, USA (2004 – friendship cities)

Local attractions 
Zensui-ji, Buddhist temple with National Treasure main hall
Chōjū-ji, Buddhist temple with National Treasure main hall
Jōraku-ji, Buddhist temple with National Treasure main hall and three-story pagoda
site of Ishibe-juku

Notable people
Tenzo Okumura, politician
Kei Aran, actress
Yuta Shimizu, tennis player

References

External links

 Konan City official website 

Cities in Shiga Prefecture
Konan, Shiga